Marthe Keller (born 28 January 1945) is a Swiss actress and opera director. She is perhaps best known for her role in the film Marathon Man (1976), for which she was nominated for a Golden Globe Award.

Career

Early years
Keller studied ballet as a child, but stopped after a skiing accident at age 16. She changed to acting, and worked in Berlin at the Schiller Theater and the Berliner Ensemble.

Film work
Keller's earliest film appearances were in Funeral in Berlin (1966, in which she was not credited) and the German film Wilder Reiter GmbH (1967). She appeared in a series of French films in the 1970s, including Un Cave (1971), La Raison du Plus Fou (1973) and Toute Une Vie/And Now My Love (1974). Her most famous American film appearances are her Golden Globe-nominated performance as Dustin Hoffman's girlfriend in Marathon Man (1976) and her performance as a femme fatale Palestinian terrorist who leads an attack on the Super Bowl in Black Sunday (1977). Keller acted alongside Al Pacino in the 1977 romantic drama film Bobby Deerfield, based on Erich Maria Remarque's novel Heaven Has No Favorites, and subsequently the two were involved in a relationship. She also acted alongside William Holden in Billy Wilder's 1978 romantic drama Fedora.

After 1978, Keller did more work in European cinema than in Hollywood. Her later films include Dark Eyes (1987), with Marcello Mastroianni.

In April 2016, she was announced as the President of the Jury for the Un Certain Regard section of the 2016 Cannes Film Festival.

Theater work
In 2001, Keller appeared in an all-star Broadway adaptation of Abby Mann's play Judgment at Nuremberg, directed by John Tillinger, as Mrs. Bertholt, in the role played by Marlene Dietrich in the 1961 Stanley Kramer film version. She was nominated for a Tony Award as Best Featured Actress for this performance.

Opera work
In addition to her work in film and theatre, Keller has developed a career in classical music as a speaker and opera director. She has performed the speaking role of Joan of Arc in Arthur Honegger's oratorio Jeanne d'Arc au bûcher on several occasions, with conductors such as Seiji Ozawa and Kurt Masur. She has recorded the role for Deutsche Grammophon with Ozawa (DG 429 412-2). Keller has also recited the spoken part in Igor Stravinsky's Perséphone. She has performed classical music melodramas for speaker and piano in recital. The Swiss composer Michael Jarrell wrote the melodrama Cassandre, after Christa Wolf's novel, for Keller, who performed in the world premiere in 1994.

Keller's first production as an opera director was Dialogues des Carmélites for Opéra national du Rhin in 1999. This production subsequently received a semi-staged performance in London that year. She has also directed Lucia di Lammermoor for Washington National Opera and for Los Angeles Opera. Her directorial debut at the Metropolitan Opera was in a 2004 production of Don Giovanni.

Theatre

Filmography

References

External links

 
 
 Yahoo! Movies biography of Marthe Keller
 

1945 births
Living people
Actors from Basel-Stadt
Swiss film actresses
Swiss stage actresses
Swiss television actresses
Swiss opera directors
Female opera directors
20th-century Swiss actresses
21st-century Swiss actresses